Norris McDonald (born 1942) is a Canadian journalist and member of the Canadian Motorsport Hall of Fame.

He is currently automotive editor of the Toronto Star, Canada's largest-circulation newspaper, where he is responsible for the Saturday Wheels section and the newspaper's automotive website. He is also the Star's motorsport reporter and columnist. He was previously news editor and entertainment editor of the Star, news editor and assistant foreign editor of the Globe and Mail, and editorial page editor and associate editor of the Kingston Whig-Standard, where he also wrote a humour column. Early in his career, he wrote sports for the Pembroke Daily Observer and was a general assignment reporter on the Orillia Packet & Times.

Biography

Early life

McDonald flunked out of Stamford Collegiate in Niagara Falls, Ontario, in 1962 after spending seven years there and never getting past Grade 11. In 1969, he graduated from Sir George Williams University (now Concordia University) in Montreal where he'd been admitted as a mature student. Named to the Honour Roll in his graduating year, his thesis in sociology, "Prostitutes are Human Beings—An Organized Counter-Institution," written with Clive L. Copeland, was subsequently published by Random House in the 1971 textbook Deviance, Reality and Change, edited by H. Taylor Buckner.

Career

His first newspaper job, in Orillia, saw him cover his first auto race, on the ice of Lake Couchiching during the 1962 Orillia Winter Carnival. He covered his first Indianapolis 500 in 1969 and his first Formula One Canadian Grand Prix in 1970, both for the Globe and Mail.

In 1982, believing strongly that journalists should know everything about who and what they cover and finding himself writing more and more about auto racing, McDonald went racing himself in a high-speed, high-expense class of open-wheel, open-cockpit car and competition called supermodified racing. Freely admitting he wasn't very good but noting that he was never black-flagged, McDonald went racing one night, only to be asked to fill in for an absent trackside announcer at Oswego Speedway on the shores of Lake Ontario in northern New York state. Putting his journalistic skills to work in interviewing drivers and reporting from "the pits," McDonald proved to be successful and popular and did the infield announcing job at the "Home of the Supermodifieds" for close to 15 years.

Although he was always employed by newspapers, he also appeared on radio and television. His racing program, Motorsport Radio, co-hosted by Jim Martyn, was carried by Toronto all-sports station The Fan 590 in the early 2000s. While in Kingston, Ontario, he hosted a television program, Feedback Live, that won critical acclaim from Canadian broadcasting legend Peter Trueman. Writing in his column in the Toronto Star's Star Week TV magazine, Trueman said: “McDonald—an old-time newshound with Runyonesque overtones—is a natural on television.”

Family

McDonald is the father of three children, Cameron, Carolina and Duncan, and lives with his partner, Susan Greene, in Mississauga, Ontario. He has no plans to retire.

Honours and awards

For his stories and columns on amateur/non-professional racing and racers, many of whom would never expect to be profiled in the country's biggest newspaper, McDonald was honoured in 2006 by being presented the Canadian Automobile Sport Club's Media Award.

For his efforts at the "Steel Palace," he was inducted into the Oswego Speedway Hall of Fame in 2010.

The highlight of his motorsport career came in 2014 when he became the first journalist to be inducted into the Canadian Motorsport Hall of Fame in a class that included woman racing pioneer Diana Carter, administrator John Magill, road-racing champion Scott Maxwell, Indy racing star Paul Tracy and international inductee Nigel Mansell.

Notes and references

External links
 Norris McDonald at the Canadian Motorsport Hall of Fame
 Toronto Star Autos
 The Morning Smile Collection by Norris McDonald and Brian Gable

Living people
1942 births
Toronto Star people
Motorsport journalists
Canadian male journalists
Canadian sportswriters
Canadian sports journalists
Journalists from Ontario
Motoring journalists